La Rocque is a former commune in the Calvados department in the Normandy region in northwestern France. On 1 January 2016, it was merged into the new commune of Valdallière.

Population

Personalities
 Colonel François de La Rocque (1885–1946), French leader of Croix-de-feu

See also
Communes of the Calvados department

References

Former communes of Calvados (department)
Calvados communes articles needing translation from French Wikipedia